Jennifer Jo Cobb Racing (also known as JJC Racing) is an American professional stock car racing team that currently competes part-time in the NASCAR Craftsman Truck Series. The team is based in Mooresville, North Carolina and is owned by Jennifer Jo Cobb, who also serves as the team's primary driver.

The team runs on one of the smaller budgets in the Truck Series, one that Cobb estimated in 2018 at between $750,000 and $1 million USD.

Camping World Truck Series

Truck No. 0 history

The No. 0 team has been used primarily as a start and park team by multiple drivers, primarily young rookies. On two occasions the truck has been run by Joe Cobb, Jennifer's father. Both entries occurred at the Mudsummer Classic.

For 2014, Caleb Roark ran with the team, typically running the first few laps before retiring to the garage. Roark would do the same thing in 2015, though Scott Lagasse Jr. placed 15th at Homestead in the truck, being the last truck on the lead lap in a fully sponsored entry.

The No. 0 team was revived in 2017 at Texas Motor Speedway in June, as the field had less than 32 trucks. The truck was driven by Tommy Regan. The 0 returned for Bryce Napier at Gateway, while Cobb failed to qualify the 0 at Iowa. After skipping Kentucky, the No. 0 returned at Eldora with Korbin Forrister driving in a partnership between Cobb's team and SS-Green Light Racing. The team ran Pocono with Matt Mills as the driver. ARCA driver Ray Ciccarelli drove the No. 0 at Michigan after making his debut at Eldora in the No. 10. He would later attempt four more races for the team in that truck for the rest of the year at New Hampshire and then the last three races of the season at Texas, Phoenix, and Homestead.

Truck No. 1 history

In 2016, after several DNQ's early in the season, JJCR formed a partnership with MAKE Motorsports which saw Cobb move from her No. 10 to MAKE's No. 1 to put her in a better position to qualify for races with the large entry lists the Truck Series saw that year. In the No. 1, Cobb attempted 11 races, earning a best finish of 17th at Michigan International Speedway. She still failed to make the field in one race (Talladega). Cobb ran all but three races for the rest of the year in the No. 1. Those three where she was not in it were the Bristol night race, where Clay Greenfield drove the truck instead in a partnership between his own team, Cobb's, and MAKE's, Martinsville in October, where she stepped out of the truck that weekend to allow ARCA driver Josh White to make his Truck debut that weekend, and the season-finale at Homestead, when Cobb was back in the No. 10 and Travis Kvapil drove the No. 1.

Truck No. 8 history
For the second race at Martinsville Speedway in the 2012 season, Cobb formed a partnership with Eddie Sharp Racing. She ran under her traditional Jennifer Jo Cobb Racing banner with Ram as the manufacturer. She finished in 34th, completing 95 laps, and retiring due to suspension issues. Chris Lafferty occupied her usual No. 10 truck.

Truck No. 10 history

In 2010 Jennifer Jo Cobb announced that she had bought the assets of the No. 10 truck from Circle Bar Racing and would run the full season. The team made their debut at the 2010 NextEra Energy Resources 250 where they finished a disappointing 34th after being involved in a first lap crash. Cobb's team would however make every race that season with a best finish of 14th on two separate occasions. At the end of the season, Cobb would finish a record 17th in the points, a highest at the time by any woman in a top tier NASCAR series.

For the 2011 season the team only made 12 of the 25 races on the schedule due to Cobb's involvement in the Nationwide Series. The teams' best finish was 6th in the season opening race at Daytona and is to date the team's only top ten finish. Also during the season the points for the No. 10 truck had been given to Chase Mattioli and his race team.

In 2012 the team entered every race on the schedule making 15 of the scheduled 22 races. However, during the season the team faced numerous mechanical failures and only managed a season best finish of 16th at Kentucky. The No. 10 saw a major drop in team performance as they finished the season with an average finish of 27.5.

2013 saw much of the same for the team as they ended the season with an average finish of 27.6 and making just 16 of the 22 races. The team also team also suffered 6 engine failures during the season and 4 additional DNF's for a total of 10, a career high. Cobb managed a season best finish of 17th at her hometown track of Kansas with sponsorship from Mark One Electric.

2014 saw a major improvement in performance by the team. Cobb only failed to qualify for one race on the schedule, the Mudsummer Classic. In addition the team suffered just 2 DNF's and garnered an average finish of 23rd.

2015 was another season of improvement for Cobb and her No. 10 team. They qualified for every single race for the first time and has compiled an average start of 26.1 along with an average finish of 23.4. In addition, Cobb made her 100th Truck Series start at the 2015 WinStar World Casino & Resort 400.

In 2016, the truck had a drop in performance, which can be attributed to the large field sizes the series saw that year. After Texas in June, Cobb switched to the No. 1 MAKE Motorsports truck in a partnership between her team and theirs, and the No. 10 was used mostly as a start and park truck for Caleb Roark and other drivers instead of the No. 0. In 23 races, the No. 10 truck had 9 DNQs, 9 DNFs, and a best finish of 24th twice (Kentucky and Kansas).

In 2017, the 10 team ran most of the races, most of them being with Cobb. Ray Ciccarelli ran two races and Bryce Napier ran at Iowa. The team’s best finish was 18th twice, at Las Vegas and Pocono, with Cobb.

In 2018, Cobb ran the full schedule, only failing to qualify twice, at Eldora and Bristol. Her best finish was an 11th-place at Talladega.

In 2022, after failing to qualify for the NextEra Energy 250, Cobb announced the team would scale back to a part-time effort and only compete in races where a full-funded effort could be made. Cobb made her appearance at Talladega, where she finished 32nd, after a clutch failure on lap 73.

Xfinity Series

Cobb's team made their debut in what is now the Xfinity Series in 2010, fielding the No. 13 Ford at Cobb's home track of Kansas. She barely qualified for the race, starting last and finishing 34th in the race. Their first race in 2011 was at the Royal Purple 200 at Darlington, where Cobb finished 32nd after starting 42nd. The team would struggle much of the season and Cobb would turn over driving duties to more experienced drivers Rick Crawford at Chicagoland and D. J. Kennington at Montreal.

Cobb decided to focus on her Truck Series team in 2012, and she returned to that series to race full-time in it with her own team that year. Therefore, she would only make four Nationwide Series attempts in 2012. The team's best finish would come during that season during the Kansas Lottery 300 where Cobb would finish 22nd.

In 2015, JJCR fielded the No. 10 car in her hometown race at the Kansas Speedway. The No. 13 had been taken by MBM Motorsports when Cobb didn't field her Xfinity team in 2013 and 2014. However, the No. 10, Cobb's truck series number, which was previously used by TriStar Motorsports earlier in the year, was available, so she used that number. The No. 10 was the car number dropped by the TriStar team when they started using the No. 24 after Eric McClure moved from JGL Racing to TriStar mid-season, keeping his same car number when switching teams.

Car No. 10 results

References

External links

NASCAR teams
Companies based in North Carolina